Scimitar is a fictional supervillain appearing in American comic books published by Marvel Comics.

Scimitar is a master of bladed weapons who serves Master Khan.

Fictional character biography
Little is known about Scimitar's past, except that his name has been used by many other people in his country of Halwan. It is even believed by some that the name gets passed on from generation to generation.

Upon his first appearance, the villain wanted to kill innocents to lure Iron Fist out of hiding, as Fist was his real target. The plan worked and Iron Fist revealed himself, and despite Scimitar's speed and fighting skills, Iron Fist was still able to defeat the villain. He had a few more run-ins with Iron Fist and his partner Luke Cage, but always ended up defeated. Scimitar disappeared from the comic pages for a long time, until he got revived in the 90's Iron Fist limited series.

This event got him hired by the terrorist group known as the Weaponeers, who now use him as their "super-agent", due to his highly skilled ways with his sword. Scimitar resurfaced with the Weaponeers in Zanzibar, where they attempted to kill the country's president, who was surprisingly enough also a retired super-hero. Thanks to X-Men member Archangel and his allies from Genosha, Scimitar and the Weaponeers ended up defeated.

Scimitar and the mysterious Weaponeers are then defeated by the X-Men right before the House of M began.

In other media

Television
In the 1990s The Incredible Hulk episode "The Lost Village", a cyborg named Scimitar (voiced by Tom Kane) had been banished from a Shangri-La-like community called Anavrin by his father Tong Zing and plotted to get back by using the medallions that will lead one to Anavrin. In the first encounter with Hulk, Scimitar bested the Hulk. When Scimitar ended up back in Anavrin, he took over Anavrin. Hulk went with another bout with Scimitar and sent him flying.

References

Characters created by Chris Claremont
Characters created by John Byrne (comics)
Fictional swordfighters in comics
Marvel Comics supervillains